"Fearful Symmetry: Kraven's Last Hunt", or simply "Kraven's Last Hunt" is a comic book storyline by J. M. DeMatteis and Mike Zeck published in 1987, featuring the final battle between Marvel Comics characters Kraven the Hunter and Spider-Man.

Considered one of the greatest Spider-Man stories of all time, the story was originally published in Web of Spider-Man #31–32, The Amazing Spider-Man #293–294, and Peter Parker, the Spectacular Spider-Man #131–132. The character Kraven the Hunter was subsequently retired until 2009.

Development
In the mid-1980s, John Marc DeMatteis proposed a Wonder Man limited series involving the latter's half-brother, the Grim Reaper, in which Wonder Man is buried and ultimately crawls out of the grave. Tom DeFalco turned down the proposal. Years later, DeMatteis reworked the scene of a hero coming out of the grave into a Batman story exploring what would happen if the Joker actually killed Batman.  According to DeMatteis, it would effectively turn the Joker "sane".  When DeMatteis pitched the story to DC, however, it was rejected because it happened to be somewhat similar to Batman: The Killing Joke, another Batman story that was in development at the time.  DeMatteis then reworked the story to use Hugo Strange in place of the Joker, but this, too, was rejected.  Finally, DeMatteis pitched the idea again to Marvel, this time with Spider-Man and a new villain he came up with specifically for the story. Marvel editorial accepted the revised proposal.

Several major elements were added to the story as DeMatteis began writing it. Marvel's plans to marry Spider-Man and Mary Jane Watson prompted DeMatteis to make their marriage the emotional focus of the story. The idea of substituting Kraven the Hunter for the new villain came to DeMatteis after a chance look at Kraven's entry in the Official Handbook of the Marvel Universe. After Mike Zeck was brought on as penciller for "Kraven's Last Hunt", DeMatteis decided it would be a good idea to use a character he and Zeck had created together: Vermin.

The story was originally intended to run entirely in Peter Parker, the Spectacular Spider-Man, but editor Jim Salicrup decided to publish it as a crossover through all three Spider-Man titles, arguing that the impact of Spider-Man being killed would be lost if there were other Spider-Man stories running at the same time. While working on the story, DeMatteis commented, "I'm not looking beyond those six issues. The storyline really does not enter too heavily into the continuity of the other books. In fact, I almost think you could take these issues and put them on their own as a mini-series or graphic novel."

Because the plot had been completely written by the time Zeck started work on "Kraven's Last Hunt", he drew all six covers for the story before doing any of the interior art. Zeck remarked that the iconic "Resurrection" cover for Part 4 (Web of Spider-Man #32) "was the absolute no-brainer of the six covers, and I completed that piece first. If an issue has a scene with the title hero rising from his own grave, it’s like receiving the number-one gift on your Christmas list! Anyone spending even one second mulling over a cover idea for that issue would have been in the wrong business. The other covers flowed from that one". DeMatteis' original draft for "Kraven's Last Hunt" was written back before "The Wedding!", so it had to be quickly rewritten to acknowledge the recent marriage of Peter Parker and Mary Jane Watson.

In 1994, DC published DeMatteis' Batman/Joker version of the story as "Going Sane" in Batman: Legends of the Dark Knight #65-68.

Story
Kraven hunts down Spider-Man, defeats him, and seemingly shoots him to death. Kraven then buries him, and dons a copy of Spider-Man's costume to prove himself superior at his adversary's former activities. While spending time roaming New York and brutally attacking criminals, Kraven culminates his crusade with the successful unarmed capture of Vermin, whom Spider-Man previously needed the help of Captain America to defeat. 

After two weeks, Spider-Man revives from the effects of Kraven's tranquilizer dart and digs his way out of the grave. When Spider-Man confronts Kraven, the hunter does not fight back, considering himself the victor and his final point made. Kraven then releases Vermin, who attacks Spider-Man, thinking him to be the one who so brutally beat him before. Vermin is able to defeat Spider-Man, but Kraven intervenes before Vermin can kill him. He allows Vermin to go free, and tells Spider-Man he can pursue him if he desires, but that Kraven's hunting days have ended. While Spider-Man goes after Vermin, Kraven retires to his home, reminiscing about his past and the peace he now feels, and commits suicide with a rifle. He leaves a confession of his burying and impersonating Spider-Man for the police to find, complete with photographic proof. Spider-Man catches up with Vermin and lures him above ground, where sensory overload renders him helpless. He turns Vermin over to the police and goes home to his wife.

Themes
Writer J. M. DeMatteis explained that the story was intended to explore Spider-Man's character and how others perceive him:

The story is told in between quotations from William Blake's poem "The Tyger", with the word "Tyger" replaced by "Spyder".

Related stories

Soul of the Hunter
A sequel to "Kraven's Last Hunt" was published in August 1992 as a 48-page prestige format graphic novel titled Amazing Spider-Man: Soul of the Hunter, again written by J.M. DeMatteis, drawn by Mike Zeck, and inked by Bob McLeod. "Soul of the Hunter" was done as a response to a widespread misinterpretation of the suicide scene in chapter 5 of "Kraven's Last Hunt". DeMatteis recalled, "Tom [DeFalco] had gotten a bunch of letters from people saying, 'Oh, you’re glorifying suicide!' Normally I would dismiss that as the usual rantings, except it really disturbed me that people would think that the purpose of that story was to glorify suicide. That is something I would never do. That is not my view of life or the universe."

In this story, Spider-Man is confronted by Kraven's ghost. Unsure what to make of this apparition, Spider-Man goes to Kraven's grave, where he sees an apparition that appears to be Death. Death tells Spider-Man that he and Kraven share a spiritual bond, and that Kraven's soul cannot find the peace it craves because of Kraven's suicide. Spider-Man is then forced to confront Kraven's body from the grave. Defeating it frees Kraven's soul and allows it to find its final rest.

What If? and What The--?!
In (vol. 2) #17 (September 1990) of the Marvel alternative history title What If?, Kraven uses real bullets instead of tranquilizers, thus actually killing Spider-Man and assuming his place. Eventually, at the request of Mary Jane, the heroes Daredevil, Captain America, and the Human Torch all confront Kraven, who eventually returns to Spider-Man's grave and digs up the body. Though not directly shown, it is implied Kraven consumes portions of Peter's body to gain his strength. Afterward, Mary Jane holds a press conference to attempt to clear Peter's name of Kraven's time as Spider-Man, but is unsuccessful in doing so because J. Jonah Jameson intervenes and convinces people to believe that all superheroes are unreliable. The issue ends on the note that Mary Jane has a lot of work ahead of her.

An issue of Marvel's satire series What The--?! spoofed "Kraven's Last Hunt" as "Raven's Last Hunt."  The spoof featured the character's animal likeness, Raven the Hunter, as well as that of Spider-Man, Spider-Ham.

Kraven's First Hunt and Grim Hunt
Kraven's First Hunt is the title of two unconnected stories: a remake of The Amazing Spider-Man #15 (which includes Kraven's first appearance), in Sensational Spider-Man Annual '96 by J.M. DeMatteis; and the debut of Kraven's teenage daughter, Ana Tatiana Kravinoff, in The Amazing Spider-Man #565-567, who attempts to capture Spider-Man in a similar manner to Kraven in "Kraven's Last Hunt". This leads into the story Grim Hunt, where Kraven's family attempt to resurrect him by sacrificing Spider-Man in an elaborate ritual, only for the ritual to be contaminated when Spider-Man's clone Kaine sacrifices himself to save Peter, resulting in Kraven being reborn as an immortal 'unlife' who can only die by Spider-Man's hand.

Spider-Man: Life Story
Spider-Man: Life Story is an alternate continuity in which the characters naturally age after Peter Parker becomes Spider-Man in 1962. In this continuity, Kraven hunts down Spider-Man in the 1980s during the midst of the Cold War shortly after he was diagnosed with cancer. Peter manages to escape the grave Kraven buried him in by bonding with the Venom symbiote, leading him to almost kill Kraven before Mary Jane separates it from him. The traumatic event causes Mary Jane to leave Peter. Kraven is satisfied with Spider-Man becoming the new hunter and prepares to kill himself, but the Venom symbiote bonds with him.

Reception
"Kraven's Last Hunt" has received critical acclaim and is considered one of the greatest Spider-Man stories ever written.  In 2012, "Kraven's Last Hunt" was voted by readers of Comic Book Resources as the greatest Spider-Man story ever told.  In his commentary on the results, Brian Cronin described the story as "a breathtaking piece of work that inspired countless imitations by other writers over the years."  Elsewhere, Cronin noted that by publishing the story across all three monthly Spider-Man titles, Marvel "gave the story a bit more of an 'event' feel".

Writing for Complex, Jason Serafino ranked "Kraven's Last Hunt" the fifth best Spider-Man story of all time.  According to Serafino, "'Kraven’s Last Hunt' features the usual comic action, but it also blends aspects from classic literature and recurring themes in order to present a deeper, more complicated narrative. It routinely quotes William Blake’s poem 'The Tyger,' and Mike Zeck’s art fills the book with gritty photorealism. This one's for a more sophisticated audience."

Comic Book Revolution ranked "Kraven's Last Hunt" third on a list of the top 10 greatest Spider-Man stories, praising the story for its portrayal of both Kraven and the early stages of Peter/Mary Jane marriage.  "[E]ven though ‘Kraven’s Last Hunt’ is a Kraven and Spider-Man story there are a lot of great moments that explore Peter and MJ’s relationship. As this story takes place early on in the marriage we get to see how MJ deals with Peter’s disappearance and how she would react if Peter ever died in action. It adds extra layers to marriage and makes the end of the story where Peter goes back to MJ to recover that much better."

IGN Comics ranked "Kraven's Last Hunt" the #6 on a list of the 25 greatest Spider-Man stories, noting that it "is one of the most memorable Spider-Man stories of all time, without a doubt."

Collected editions

In other media

Film
 Richard Wenk revealed that Kraven the Hunter's proposed stand-alone film will draw inspirations from Kraven's Last Hunt, and that the film would include Spider-Man.

Prose novel
A novelised adaption of Kraven's Last Hunt was released in October 2014 as part of Marvel Prose Novel series, adapted from the original issues and expanded upon by Neil Kleid. In this adaptation, Peter and Mary Jane are not married, due to the changes in continuity that resulted from the "One More Day" story arc.

See also
 "The Gauntlet" and "Grim Hunt"

References

External links

 

Comics by J. M. DeMatteis
Fiction about suicide